Matt Mahaffey (born June 9, 1973) is an American multi-instrumentalist, record producer, composer, and recording engineer best known for his band Self and his composer collective Cake In Space.

Personal
Mahaffey grew up in Kingsport, Tennessee and was involved with music from a young age. He started writing songs and playing the drums at age 4 and would often perform with his brother, Mike Mahaffey, when they were growing up.
By age eleven, he was playing drums at Dollywood, Dolly Parton's theme park in Pigeon Forge. In the mid-nineties he moved to Murfreesboro, Tennessee and attended MTSU. He lived and worked for 10 years in Murfreesboro and co-founded Spongebath Records. He also formed the band Self in 1994.

In the early 2000s, Mahaffey relocated from Murfreesboro to Los Angeles, in order to be closer to his record label, Universal Records, and to produce.

He has a daughter with his former wife. As of January 2, 2020, he is married to singer-songwriter Leticia Wolf of Nashville-based band The Dead Deads.

Work

Music production
Matt has performed with and produced for many artists. Some well-known artists he has worked with include Pink, Beck, Liz Phair, Tenacious D, Lupe Fiasco, Snoop Dogg, Phantom Planet, Beyoncé, Butch Walker, Hellogoodbye, Forever the Sickest Kids, Miranda Cosgrove, The White Tie Affair, Keith Urban, The Sounds, L.E.O. and Smash Mouth.
In 2005, Matt began producing with Jeff Turzo (God Lives Underwater) under the moniker Wired All Wrong. Wired All Wrong's first full production, Hellogoodbye's Zombies! Aliens! Vampires! Dinosaurs! yielded the platinum single, "Here (In Your Arms)". Matt recently contributed to Lupe Fiasco's certified gold album Lasers, and Beck's Grammy winning Album of the Year 2015, Morning Phase.

Performance

Mahaffey played various instruments with Beck throughout 2005's Guero tour and 2006's The Information tour. In the past, he has performed with artists such as Mandy Moore and Mika.

Film
Mahaffey has worked with various film makers including Ivan Reitman, Michael Mann, Jeffrey Katzenberg, Andrew Adamson, & Hans Zimmer (for film score). He wrote "Stay Home" for the Shrek soundtrack, and subsequently produced the music for the surprise endings of Shrek,  Shrek 2, and Shrek Forever After. 
Matt recently contributed to the film score of The Boss Baby: Family Business. He also was the composer for Rise of the Teenage Mutant Ninja Turtles: The Movie.

Television
Mahaffey and his brother, Mike Mahaffey, wrote and performed the infamous Expedia.com tagline. Matt has also written jingles and composed music for Pedigree, Jumbone, Medicare, and Lexus. His music has been featured on numerous shows including CSI: Miami, DanceLife, Entourage, MTV, E! Entertainment, Dirty Sexy Money, Weeds, and 60 Minutes. Matt wrote and produced the music for Nickelodeon's Ni Hao, Kai-Lan. Mahaffey also played the Muppet character "Animal" in a drum-off with Blink-182 drummer, Travis Barker, on Jimmy Kimmel Live!.
He provided the Score and Songs for Disney's Henry Hugglemonster, Nickelodeon's Sanjay and Craig, Nella the Princess Knight, Rise of the Teenage Mutant Ninja Turtles, The Barbarian and the Troll. He is currently providing Score and Songs for Karma's World and Dogs In Space for Netflix. Mahaffey is Emmy and Annie Award nominated.

References

External links
MattMahaffey.com – Matt Mahaffey Official Website

American rock musicians
Living people
1973 births